Pierangelo Manzaroli (born 25 March 1969) is a retired Sammarinese footballer, currently a manager.

Career
Manzaroli was a midfielder and played for the San Marino national team.

Having managed the San Marino U21s team to a competitive win on home soil over Wales, he moved to take the job of the senior team. He took the place of record-making manager Giampaolo Mazza. Manzaroli's first match as manager was a home friendly against Albania. San Marino lost 0–3.

On 15 November 2014 he led his team to their first non-negative result in 10 years, when San Marino drew 0–0 at home against Estonia.

Managerial statistics

References

http://www.fsgc.sm/il-nuovo-ct-della-nazionale-maggiore/

1969 births
Sammarinese footballers
San Marino national football team managers
San Marino international footballers
Italian footballers
Italian people of Sammarinese descent
Living people
Sportspeople from Rimini
Association football midfielders
Italian football managers
Footballers from Emilia-Romagna